The lex Atinia may refer to one of several pieces of Roman legislation.

lex Atinia (197 BC)

The lex Atinia de usucapione was introduced by Gaius Atinius Labeo in 197 BC. The law dealt with usucaption, acquisition of a title or right to property by uninterrupted and undisputed possession for a prescribed term.

The law prevented the acquisition of title by continued possession of stolen goods.  Aulus Gellius (17.7) quotes it and cites its meaning.

lex Atinia (Late Second Century BC)

The lex Atinia de tribunis plebis in senatum legendis was a law dealing with the enrolment of tribunes of the plebs into the Senate. There is much debate about its exact date and provisions. It probably entitled a holder of the office to sit in the senate as a tribuniscius with a presumptive inclusion for the next senatorial lectio.

See also
List of Roman laws
Roman Law

References

Roman law
Reform in the Roman Republic
2nd century BC in the Roman Republic